Brough is a small village (population 66) in Caithness in the North of Scotland. It is located on the B855 single-track road, the most northerly numbered road on the mainland of Great Britain, and is a few miles to the south east of Dunnet Head, the most northerly point on the British mainland, and a mile or so north of the village of Dunnet. Brough is the site of Brough Castle, a twelfth Century Norse fortress; the ruins are on the property now known as Heathcliff.  Brough is the most northerly village on the British mainland.

The village has a bus stop. Brough harbour, a short distance to the north of the village, now little used, faces Little Clett rock, a small islet that shelters the harbour from the north. The slipway was originally built to assist the construction and maintenance of Dunnet Head lighthouse (1831).

To the south of the village lies St John's Loch, reputedly a very good brown trout loch.

Name
The name Brough is pronounced to rhyme with the Scottish word loch, in contrast to the English town of Brough, which is pronounced to rhyme with rough

The village's name comes from Broch, the ancient Scottish circular building, whose purpose is somewhat undetermined but was probably some kind of fortified homestead. The remains of at least one broch exist in the area around the village.

Wildlife
The village, and the area, are popular particularly with birdspotters, providing opportunities to see many puffins (at Brough Harbour) and Great Northern Divers among others.

References

Populated places in Caithness